Sergei Nikolayevich Khramtsov (born 28 February 1977) is a Russian former professional footballer.

Club career
He made his professional debut in the Russian Premier League in 1996 for FC Rotor Volgograd.

Honours
 Russian Premier League bronze: 1996.

References

1977 births
Living people
Russian footballers
Association football defenders
Russian Premier League players
FC Rotor Volgograd players
FC Tekstilshchik Kamyshin players
FC Lokomotiv Nizhny Novgorod players
FC Elista players
FC Mordovia Saransk players
FC Kuban Krasnodar players
FC Spartak Nizhny Novgorod players